Trude Dybendahl (born 8 January 1966), sometimes listed as Trude Dybendahl-Hartz or Trude Dybendahl Hartz, is a former Norwegian cross-country skier who competed from 1986 to 1998. She won three silver medals in the 4 × 5 km relay at the Winter Olympics (1988, 1992, 1994). Her best individual Olympic finish was fourth in the 30 km event in 1994.

Dybendahl also won six medals at the FIS Nordic World Ski Championships with one gold (5 km: 1991), two silvers (15 km: 1991, 4 × 5 km relay: 1997), and three bronzes (4 × 5 km relay: 1991, 1993; 5 km: 1993). She also won the 20 km double pursuit event at the 1990 Holmenkollen ski festival.

During her career, Dybendahl represented Kjelsås IL in Oslo.

Cross-country skiing results
All results are sourced from the International Ski Federation (FIS).

Olympic Games
 3 medals – (3 silver)

World Championships
 6 medals – (1 gold, 2 silver, 3 bronze)

World Cup

Season standings

Individual podiums

7 victories 
18 podiums

Team podiums

 9 victories – (9 ) 
 30 podiums – (28 , 2 )

Note:   Until the 1999 World Championships and the 1994 Olympics, World Championship and Olympic races were included in the World Cup scoring system.

References

External links
 
 
 

1966 births
Cross-country skiers at the 1988 Winter Olympics
Cross-country skiers at the 1992 Winter Olympics
Cross-country skiers at the 1994 Winter Olympics
Cross-country skiers at the 1998 Winter Olympics
Holmenkollen Ski Festival winners
Living people
Norwegian female cross-country skiers
Olympic cross-country skiers of Norway
Olympic silver medalists for Norway
Olympic medalists in cross-country skiing
FIS Nordic World Ski Championships medalists in cross-country skiing
Medalists at the 1988 Winter Olympics
Medalists at the 1992 Winter Olympics
Medalists at the 1994 Winter Olympics
Skiers from Oslo